Vernon National Forest was established as the Vernon Forest Reserve by the U.S. Forest Service in Utah on April 24, 1906 with  in the northwestern part of the state near the town of Vernon.  It became a National Forest on March 4, 1907. On July 1, 1908 Vernon and Payson National Forests and part of Fillmore were combined to create  Nebo National Forest.  The lands presently managed under the Uinta-Wasatch-Cache National Forest.

See also
 Harker Canyon (Tooele County, Utah)

References

External links
Forest History Society
Listing of the National Forests of the United States and Their Dates (from Forest History Society website) Text from Davis, Richard C., ed. Encyclopedia of American Forest and Conservation History. New York: Macmillan Publishing Company for the Forest History Society, 1983. Vol. II, pp. 743-788.

Former National Forests of Utah
Protected areas of Tooele County, Utah